Platynus maculicollis (common names: grease bug, overflow bug) is a ground beetle.

It is common in California, where it is occasionally a pest in houses because of its disagreeable odor when crushed, and because it nibbles bread and meats.

Notes

References

 Platynus maculicollis at ZipcodeZoo

Platyninae